In historical linguistics, a chain shift is a set of sound changes in which the change in pronunciation of one speech sound (typically, a phoneme) is linked to, and presumably causes, a change in pronunciation of other sounds as well. The sounds involved in a chain shift can be ordered into a "chain" in such a way that after the change is complete, each phoneme ends up sounding like what the phoneme before it in the chain sounded like before the change. The changes making up a chain shift, interpreted as rules of phonology, are in what is termed counterfeeding order.

A well-known example is the Great Vowel Shift, which was a chain shift that affected all of the long vowels in Middle English. The changes to the front vowels may be summarized as follows:

  →  →  → 

A drag chain or pull chain is a chain shift in which the phoneme at the "leading" edge of the chain changes first. A push chain is a chain shift in which the phoneme at the "end" of the chain moves first: in this example, if  moved toward , a "crowding" effect would be created and  would thus move toward , and so forth.

Examples

During the Great Vowel Shift in the 15th and 16th centuries, all of the long vowels of Middle English, which correspond to tense vowels in Modern English, shifted pronunciation. The changes can be summarized as follows:

The Great Vowel Shift occurred over centuries, and not all varieties of English  were affected in the same ways.

A chain shift may affect only one regional dialect of a language, or it may begin in a particular regional dialect and then expand beyond the region in which it originated. A number of recent regional chain shifts have occurred in English.  Perhaps the most well-known is the Northern Cities Vowel Shift, which is largely confined to the "Inland North" region of the United States.  Other examples in North America are the California vowel shift, Southern vowel shift (in the Southern United States) and the Canadian Shift.  In England, the Cockney vowel shift among working-class Londoners is familiar from its prominence in plays such as George Bernard Shaw's Pygmalion (and the related musical My Fair Lady):
  →  →  →  → 

Many chain shifts are vowel shifts, because many sets of vowels are naturally arranged on a multi-value scale (e.g. vowel height or frontness).  However, chain shifts can also occur in consonants. A famous example of such a shift is the well-known First Germanic Sound Shift or Grimm's Law, in which the Proto-Indo-European voiceless stop consonants became fricatives, the plain voiced stops became voiceless, and the breathy voiced stops became plain voiced:
  →  →  → 
  →  →  → 
  →  →  → 

Another is the High German consonant shift which separated Old High German from other West Germanic dialects such as Old English, Old Frisian, and Old Saxon:
{| class="wikitable"
|  →  → , 
|-
|  →  → , 
|-
|  →  → , 
|}

The Romance languages to the north and west of central Italy (e.g. French, Spanish, Portuguese, Catalan and various northern Italian languages) are known for a set of chain shifts collectively termed lenition, which affected stop consonants between vowels:
  →  →  → , 
  →  →  →  (or vanishes)
  →  →  → ,  (or vanishes)
In this case, each sound became weaker (or more "lenited").

Synchronic shifts

It is also possible for chain shifts to occur synchronically, within the phonology of a language as it exists at a single point in time.

Nzebi (or Njebi), a Bantu language of Gabon, has the following chain shift, triggered morphophonologically by certain tense/aspect suffixes:

Examples follow:

{|
! Underlying form !! Chain-shifted form
|-
|  "to work" ||  → 
|-
|  "to give" ||  → 
|-
|  "to carry" ||  → 
|-
|  "to refuse" ||  → 
|-
|  "to go down" ||  → 
|-
|  "to arrive" ||  → 
|-
|  "to hide oneself" ||  → 
|}

Another example of a chain from Bedouin Hijazi Arabic involves vowel raising and deletion:

In nonfinal open syllables,  raises to  while  in the same position is deleted.

Synchronic chain shifts may be circular. An example of this is Xiamen tone or Taiwanese tone sandhi:

The contour tones are lowered to a lower tone, and the lowest tone (21) circles back to the highest tone (53).

Synchronic chain shifts are an example of the theoretical problem of phonological opacity. Although easily accounted for in a derivational rule-based phonology, its analysis in standard parallel Optimality Theory is problematic.

See also
 Isogloss
 Sound change

References

Historical linguistics
Phonology
Sound changes